Hugo Pimentel (25 January 1919, in San Fernando, Buenos Aires – 1 June 1984, in Caracas) was an Argentine actor. He starred in the acclaimed Silver Condor-winning 1943 film Juvenilia.  Other notable films include His Best Student (1944), La viudita naviera (1962) and A Woman of No Importance (1945).

Selected filmography
 Son cartas de amor (1943)
 His Best Student (1944)
 A Woman of No Importance (1945)
 Wake Up to Life (1945)
 The Honourable Tenant (1951)
 The Blackmailers (1963)
 Man Called Gringo (1965)
 Fuerte perdido (1965)
 Goldface, the Fantastic Superman (1967)

References

External links
 

Argentine male film actors
1919 births
1984 deaths
People from San Fernando de la Buena Vista
20th-century Argentine male actors